Baltzell is a surname. Notable people with the surname include:

E. Digby Baltzell (1915–1996), American sociologist, academic and author
John R. Baltzell (1827–1893), Mayor of Madison, Wisconsin
Joseph Baltzell Showalter (1851–1932), Republican member of the U.S. House of Representatives from Pennsylvania
Robert C. Baltzell (1879–1950), United States federal judge
Thomas Baltzell (1804–1866), American lawyer and politician and the first popularly elected chief justice of the Florida Supreme Court
Vic Baltzell (1912–1986), American football fullback in the National Football League